Statistics of the Primera División de México for the 1951–52 season.

Overview
Zacatepec was promoted to Primera División.

The season was contested by 12 teams, and León won the championship.

Veracruz was relegated to Segunda División.

Teams

League standings

Results

References
Mexico - List of final tables (RSSSF)

1951-52
Mex
1951–52 in Mexican football